The National Management Association (NMA) was founded in 1925 by Mr. Charles F. Kettering. Initially named the National Association of Foreman, NMA is a national, non-profit leadership development organization headquartered in Dayton, Ohio with a membership of over 22,000.

History 

In 1919, Charles F. Kettering formed the Foreman’s Club of Dayton in order to provide better structure to the concept of continuing education.  The Foreman’s Club of Dayton was attracting members from a broader spectrum of management and supervisory levels. So in 1925 the name was changed to “The National Management Association”.

In 1974, with the help of the International Management Council and the National Management Association, the Institute of Certified Professional Managers was created.

In 1988, NMA created a Speech Contest dedicated to the Free Enterprise System where cash prizes are awarded for the best speech. The contest involves children in grades nine through twelve where they create and deliver a speech based upon their interpretation of our Free Enterprise system. In 2009 NMA changed the Speech Contest from "American Enterprise" to "Leadership" to promote better understanding of Leadership and the role it plays in today’s world. The Speech Contest has remained the only youth program offered by NMA.

Dayton, Ohio was the location of NMA’s national headquarters facility.  Ground was broken in 1969 for the current NMA Headquarters – dedicated forty years later on July 18, 2009, as The Fritz Hauf Memorial Building.

In 2005, NMA, while legally remaining The National Management Association, re-branded itself as "NMA...THE Leadership Development Organization" to respond to the realities of a changing workforce and a customer base that was focusing on not only management development but leadership development in a global economy.

References
https://nma1.org/about-us
http://www.icpm.biz/index.php?option=com_content&task=view&id=63&Itemid=167

Non-profit organizations based in Ohio
Organizations based in Dayton, Ohio
Organizations established in 1925
Charles F. Kettering